Lvea Aem District is a district (srok) of Kandal Province, Cambodia. The district is subdivided into 15 communes (khum) such as Akreiy Ksatr, Barong, Boeng Krum, Kaoh Kaev, Kaoh Reah, Lvea Sa, Peam Oknha Ong, Phum Thum, Preaek Kmeng, Preaek Rey, Preaek Ruessei, Sambuor, Sarikakaev, Thma Kor, Tuek Khleang and 43 villages (phum).

Administrative divisions
Lvea Aem District is divided into the following khums

References

External links
Kandal at Royal Government of Cambodia website
Kandal at Ministry of Commerce website

Districts of Kandal province